Shekinah may refer to:

 Shekhinah, the Hebrew word for God's presence in the world of Earth. 
 Shekhina, a book of poetry by Leonard Nimoy and Donald Kuspit 
 Shekhinah (singer), South African singer